The 2004 NASCAR Busch Series began on February 14 and ended on November 20. Martin Truex Jr. of Chance 2 Motorsports won the championship.

2004 teams and drivers

Full schedule

Limited schedule

Henderson Motorsports (the No. 75 car, driven by Jay Sauter) and Henderson Racing (the No. 63 car, driven by Jimmy Henderson) are two different teams.

Schedule

Races

Hershey's Kisses 300

The Hershey's Kisses 300 started on February 14 but was postponed to February 16 due to rain. The race was held at Daytona International Speedway. Martin Truex Jr. won the pole. This was the first of NASCAR's top national touring series races to be broadcast in high definition.

Top ten results

8-Dale Earnhardt Jr.
27-Johnny Sauter
55-Robby Gordon
21-Kevin Harvick
17-Matt Kenseth
32-David Stremme
2-Ron Hornaday Jr.
00-Jason Leffler
22-Jason Keller
37-David Green

Failed to qualify: Mike Harmon (#24), David Keith (#95), Stanton Barrett (#91), Kevin Conway (#51), Stan Boyd (#57), Regan Smith (#56), Kim Crosby (#28), Robby Benton (#39), Mark Martin (#9), Brian Conz (#05), Norm Benning (#84)

Goody's Headache Powder 200

The Goody's Headache Powder 200 was held on February 21 at North Carolina Speedway. Johnny Benson won the pole.

Top ten results

30-Jamie McMurray
8-Martin Truex Jr.
21-Kevin Harvick
99-Michael Waltrip
37-David Green
27-Johnny Sauter
5-Kyle Busch
25-Bobby Hamilton Jr.
1-Johnny Benson
2-Ron Hornaday Jr.

Failed to qualify: Kenny Wallace (#23)*, Shane Sieg (#51), Eddie Beahr (#94), Paul Wolfe (#6), Jerry Reary (#41)
This was McMurray's 4th consecutive Busch series victory at North Carolina Speedway.
Kenny Wallace drove Stanton Barrett's #91 car for the race after failing to qualify.

Sam's Town 300

The Sam's Town 300 was held on March 6 at Las Vegas Motor Speedway. Mike Bliss won the pole. Johnny Sauter, who finished in 16th suffered a 25-point penalty after the race for cursing in his on-air interview.

Top ten results

21-Kevin Harvick
38-Kasey Kahne
32-David Stremme
99-Michael Waltrip
25-Bobby Hamilton Jr.
9-Matt Kenseth
12-Tim Fedewa
22-Jason Keller
87-Joe Nemechek
60-Greg Biffle

Failed to qualify: Andy Ponstein (#39), David Starr (#50), Larry Gunselman (#72), Damon Lusk (#74), Bruce Bechtel (#52), Randy Briggs (#85)

Diamond Hill Plywood 200

The Diamond Hill Plywood 200 was held on March 20 at Darlington Raceway. Kyle Busch won the pole.

Top ten results

60-Greg Biffle
9-Jeff Burton
37-David Green
8-Martin Truex Jr.
32-David Stremme
1-Johnny Benson
55-Robby Gordon
99-Michael Waltrip
14-Casey Atwood
20-Mike Bliss

Failed to qualify: Eddie Beahr (#94), Norm Benning (#84)

Sharpie Professional 250

The Sharpie Professional 250 was held on March 27 at Bristol Motor Speedway. Greg Biffle won the pole.

Top ten results

8-Martin Truex Jr.
21-Kevin Harvick
5-Kyle Busch
60-Greg Biffle
37-David Green
74-Tony Raines
99-Michael Waltrip
22-Jason Keller
2-Ron Hornaday Jr.
4-Mike Wallace

This was Truex's first career victory.
Failed to qualify: Justin Ashburn (#16), Butch Jarvis (#53), Mike Potter (#0)

O'Reilly 300

The O'Reilly 300 was held on April 3 at Texas Motor Speedway. Kyle Busch won the pole.

Top ten results

17-Matt Kenseth
5-Kyle Busch
55-Robby Gordon
1-Johnny Benson
25-Bobby Hamilton Jr.
00-Jason Leffler
87-Joe Nemechek
37-David Green
9-Jeff Burton
8-Martin Truex Jr.

Failed to qualify: Stan Boyd (#51), Brad Teague (#39), Blake Mallory (#0), Donnie Neuenberger (#77), Justin Ashburn (#16), Bruce Bechtel (#52)

Pepsi 300

The Pepsi 300 was held on April 10 at Nashville Superspeedway. Martin Truex Jr. won the pole. Michael Waltrip won the race after Robby Gordon, Johnny Benson, Clint Bowyer, and Kyle Busch tangled on the backstretch while battling for the lead.

Top ten results

99-Michael Waltrip
27-Johnny Sauter
38-Kasey Kahne
21-Clint Bowyer
55-Robby Gordon
5-Kyle Busch
1-Johnny Benson
20-Mike Bliss
22-Jason Leffler
37-David Green

Failed to qualify: Shane Wallace (#63), Stan Boyd (#51), Justin Ashburn (#16), Chad Chaffin (#77), Mike Harmon (#24), Greg Sacks (#0), Morgan Shepherd (#89), Jimmy Kitchens (#97), Eddie Beahr (#94), Norm Benning (#84), Brad Baker (#85)

Aaron's 312 (Talladega)

The Aaron's 312 was held on April 24 at Talladega Superspeedway. Clint Bowyer won the pole.

Top ten results

8-Martin Truex Jr.
81-Dale Earnhardt Jr.
2-Ron Hornaday Jr.
5-Kyle Busch
00-Jason Leffler
23-Kenny Wallace
55-Robby Gordon
99-Michael Waltrip
37-David Green
87-Joe Nemechek

Failed to qualify: Gus Wasson (#0), Robby Benton (#03)

Stater Brothers 300 presented by Gatorade

The Stater Brothers 300 presented by Gatorade was held on May 1 at California Speedway. Jason Leffler won the pole.

Top ten results

60-Greg Biffle
29-Tony Stewart
59-Stacy Compton
17-Matt Kenseth
38-Kasey Kahne
99-Michael Waltrip
5-Kyle Busch
21-Kevin Harvick
23-Kenny Wallace
25-Bobby Hamilton Jr.

Failed to qualify: Johnny Borneman III (#35), David Starr (#50), Bruce Bechtel (#57), Stanton Barrett (#91)

Charter 250

The Charter 250 was held on May 8 at Gateway International Raceway. Martin Truex Jr. won the pole.

Top ten results

8-Martin Truex Jr.
2-Ron Hornaday Jr.
22-Jason Keller
25-Bobby Hamilton Jr.
5-Kyle Busch
00-Jason Leffler
60-Greg Biffle
32-David Stremme
12-Tim Fedewa
55-Robby Gordon

Failed to qualify: Clint Vahsholtz (#90), Brad Teague (#53), Shane Wallace (#63), Dion Ciccarelli (#84), Randy Briggs (#85)

Funai 250

The Funai 250 was held on May 14 at Richmond International Raceway. Kyle Busch won the pole.

Top ten results

5-Kyle Busch
60-Greg Biffle
21-Kevin Harvick
25-Bobby Hamilton Jr.
22-Jason Keller
37-David Green
8-Martin Truex Jr.
20-Mike Bliss
23-Kenny Wallace
38-Kasey Kahne

This was Busch's first career victory.
Failed to qualify: Eddie Beahr (#94), Chad Beahr (#90)

Goulds Pumps/ITT Industries 200

The Goulds Pumps/ITT Industries 200 was held on May 23 at Nazareth Speedway. Kyle Busch won the pole. This was the last race at Nazareth. Jason Rudd, who finished 42nd, suffered a 25-point penalty for unknown reasons.

Top ten results

8-Martin Truex Jr.
25-Bobby Hamilton Jr.
37-David Green
22-Jason Keller
32-David Stremme
14-Casey Atwood
00-Jason Leffler
99-Michael Waltrip
23-Kenny Wallace
5-Kyle Busch

Failed to qualify: none

Carquest Auto Parts 300

The Carquest Auto Parts 300 was held on May 29 at Lowe's Motor Speedway. Greg Biffle won the pole.

Top ten results

5-Kyle Busch
1-Jamie McMurray
21-Kevin Harvick
00-Jason Leffler
29-Tony Stewart
60-Greg Biffle
2-Ron Hornaday Jr.
32-David Stremme
23-Kenny Wallace
46-Ashton Lewis

Failed to qualify: Regan Smith (#56), J. J. Yeley (#18)

MBNA America 200

The MBNA America 200 was held on June 5–7 at Dover International Speedway. David Green won the pole. Ron Hornaday Jr., who finished 29th, suffered a 25-point penalty for cursing in a radio interview during the race

Top ten results

60-Greg Biffle
8-Martin Truex Jr.
37-David Green
25-Bobby Hamilton Jr.
5-Kyle Busch
21-Kevin Harvick
38-Kasey Kahne
1-Jamie McMurray
12-Tim Fedewa
27-Johnny Sauter

Failed to qualify: Dion Ciccarelli (#84)

Federated Auto Parts 300

The Federated Auto Parts 300 was held on June 12 at Nashville Superspeedway. Martin Truex Jr. won the pole.

Top ten results

00-Jason Leffler
8-Martin Truex Jr.
21-Clint Bowyer
20-Mike Bliss
2-Ron Hornaday Jr.
38-Kasey Kahne
14-Casey Atwood
18-J. J. Yeley
46-Ashton Lewis
59-Stacy Compton

This was Leffler's first career victory.
Failed to qualify: Justin Ashburn (#16), Joe Buford (#53), Steven Christian (#34), Eddie Beahr (#94), David Keith (#0)

Meijer 300 presented by Oreo

The Meijer 300 presented by Oreo was held on June 19 at Kentucky Speedway. Martin Truex Jr. won the pole.

Top ten results

5-Kyle Busch
60-Greg Biffle
20-Mike Bliss
2-Ron Hornaday Jr.
22-Jason Keller
8-Martin Truex Jr.
00-Jason Leffler
46-Ashton Lewis
32-David Stremme
21-Clint Bowyer

Failed to qualify: Brad Teague (#52), Shawna Robinson (#91), Stuart Kirby (#65), Justin Ashburn (#16), Chris Horn (#58)

Alan Kulwicki 250

The Alan Kulwicki 250 was held on June 26 at The Milwaukee Mile. David Stremme won the pole.

Top ten results

2-Ron Hornaday Jr.
32-David Stremme
22-Jason Keller
38-Shane Hmiel
25-Bobby Hamilton Jr.
20-Mike Bliss
60-Greg Biffle
37-David Green
8-Martin Truex Jr.
21-Clint Bowyer

Failed to qualify: none

Winn-Dixie 250 presented by PepsiCo

The Winn-Dixie 250 presented by PepsiCo was held on July 2 at Daytona International Speedway. Mike Bliss won the pole.

Top ten results

4-Mike Wallace*
60-Greg Biffle
8-Martin Truex Jr.
47-Robert Pressley
20-Mike Bliss
38-Kasey Kahne
1-Casey Mears
21-Kevin Harvick
2-Ron Hornaday Jr.
12-Tim Fedewa

This was Wallace's first victory since IRP in 1994. It was an emotional victory for Wallace, who was publicly thanked by Tony Stewart in victory lane for giving Tony, "some of the best advice I've ever got in my life."
Failed to qualify: Mike Harmon (#24), Brad Teague (#0)

Tropicana Twister 300

The Twister 300 was held on July 10 at Chicagoland Speedway. Bobby Hamilton Jr. won the pole. Justin Labonte won his first (and only) race, and this win is one of the biggest upsets in the Grand National Series history. With the win, there are three Labonte's with wins in NASCAR.

Top ten results

44-Justin Labonte
22-Jason Keller
9-Jeff Burton
38-Kasey Kahne
46-Ashton Lewis
55-Robby Gordon
00-Jason Leffler
37-David Green
18-J. J. Yeley
2-Ron Hornaday Jr.

Failed to qualify: Jeff Fuller (#88), Blake Mallory (#51), Jimmy Kitchens (#77), Carl Long (#07), Larry Hollenbeck (#62), Stanton Barrett (#91), Kevin Conway (#56)
During qualifying, the trademark Tropicana orange was blown off its stand by severe wind, and driver Todd Szegedy narrowly avoided the wayward fruit. He was later granted an opportunity to re-qualify. This accident caused the sponsor of the Nextel and Busch races to change from Tropicana to various sponsors in 2005.

Siemens 200

The Siemens 200 was held on July 24 at New Hampshire International Speedway. Jamie McMurray won the pole.

Top ten results

17-Matt Kenseth
12-Tim Fedewa
00-Jason Leffler
38-Kasey Kahne
21-Kevin Harvick
2-Ron Hornaday Jr.
23-Kenny Wallace
59-Stacy Compton
25-Bobby Hamilton Jr.
4-Mike Wallace

Failed to qualify: David Keith (#0), Dion Ciccarelli (#84), Randy MacDonald (#71), Bill Hoff (#93), Stuart Kirby (#65)

ITT Industries & Goulds Pumps Salute to the Troops 250

The ITT Industries & Goulds Pumps Salute to the Troops 250 was held on July 31 at Pikes Peak International Raceway. Martin Truex Jr. won the pole.

Top ten results

60-Greg Biffle
59-Stacy Compton
00-Jason Leffler
2-Clint Bowyer
8-Martin Truex Jr.
20-Mike Bliss
32-David Stremme
37-David Green
14-Casey Atwood
25-Bobby Hamilton Jr.

Failed to qualify: Mike Harmon (#08), Ron Barfield Jr. (#97), Ryck Sanders (#07), Tim Edwards (#73)

Kroger 200 presented by Tom Raper RVs

The Kroger 200 presented by Tom Raper RVs was held on August 7 at Indianapolis Raceway Park. Johnny Sauter won the pole.

Top ten results

5-Kyle Busch
27-Johnny Sauter
00-Jason Leffler
8-Martin Truex Jr.
60-Greg Biffle
25-Bobby Hamilton Jr.
20-Mike Bliss
14-Casey Atwood
23-Kenny Wallace
37-David Green

Failed to qualify: John Hayden (#16), Brad Teague (#52), Kenny Hendrick (#35), Roland Isaacs (#71), Jimmy Kitchens (#77), Butch Jarvis (#53), Dana White (#51)

Cabela's 250

The Cabela's 250 was held on August 21 at Michigan International Speedway. Martin Truex Jr. won the pole.

Top ten results

5-Kyle Busch
9-Mark Martin
8-Martin Truex Jr.
1-Casey Mears
38-Kasey Kahne
66-Rusty Wallace
00-Jason Leffler
60-Greg Biffle
4-Mike Wallace
20-Mike Bliss

Failed to qualify: Kevin Lepage (#71), Tony Stewart (#81), Paul Menard (#11), Skip Smith (#67), Shelby Howard (#35), Todd Szegedy (#7)

Food City 250

The Food City 250 was held on August 27 at Bristol Motor Speedway. Dale Earnhardt Jr. won the pole.

Top ten results

81-Dale Earnhardt Jr.
17-Matt Kenseth
5-Kyle Busch
21-Kevin Harvick
37-David Green
32-David Stremme
8-Martin Truex Jr.
22-Jason Keller
47-Robert Pressley
14-Casey Atwood

Failed to qualify: Brad Teague (#52), Joe Buford (#53), Mike Potter (#0), Cam Strader (#06), Morgan Shepherd (#51), Rick Markle (#68), Caleb Holman (#96), John Hayden (#16)

Target House 300

The Target House 300 was held on September 4 at California Speedway. Casey Mears won the pole.

Top ten results

60-Greg Biffle
1-Casey Mears
21-Kevin Harvick
38-Kasey Kahne
66-Jamie McMurray
8-Martin Truex Jr.
18-Bobby Labonte
87-Joe Nemechek
5-Kyle Busch
00-Jason Leffler

Failed to qualify: Morgan Shepherd (#57)

Emerson Radio 250

The Emerson Radio 250 was held on September 10 at Richmond International Raceway. Kasey Kahne won the pole.

Top ten results

55-Robby Gordon *
14-Casey Atwood
8-Martin Truex Jr.
00-Jason Leffler
5-Kyle Busch
20-Mike Bliss
21-Kevin Harvick
32-David Stremme
38-Kasey Kahne
27-Johnny Sauter

Failed to qualify: Mike Potter (#0), Todd Bodine (#31), Justin Labonte (#44), Eric McClure (#04), Jay Sauter (#75), Kevin Lepage (#71), Tim Sauter (#56), Eddie Beahr (#94), Wayne Edwards (#70), Jimmy Kitchens (#77), Tina Gordon (#39)

 This was the only Busch Series (now Xfinity Series) victory for Robby Gordon, as well as his only NASCAR win for his own NASCAR team.

Stacker 200 presented by YJ Stinger

The Stacker 200 presented by YJ Stinger was on held September 25 at Dover International Speedway. Kasey Kahne won the pole.

Top ten results

8-Martin Truex Jr.
25-Mike McLaughlin
38-Kasey Kahne
00-Jason Leffler
27-Johnny Sauter
21-Kevin Harvick
2-Ron Hornaday Jr.
9-Mark Martin
5-Kyle Busch
37-David Green

Failed to qualify: Morgan Shepherd (#71), Dion Ciccarelli (#84), Matt Kobyluck (#40), Bill Hoff (#93), Stan Boyd (#65)

Mr. Goodcents 300

The Mr. Goodcents 300 was held on October 9 at Kansas Speedway. Paul Menard won the pole.

Top ten results

87-Joe Nemechek
60-Greg Biffle
32-David Stremme
46-Ashton Lewis
2-Ron Hornaday Jr.
18-J. J. Yeley
22-Jason Keller
1-Casey Mears
59-Stacy Compton
35-Wally Dallenbach Jr.

Failed to qualify: John Hayden (#16), Brad Teague (#52), Stan Boyd (#71), Shane Hall (#28), Morgan Shepherd (#0), Chris Horn (#58), Kenny Hendrick (#51), Jimmy Kitchens (#77), Bill Eversole (#56), Randy Briggs (#85), Clint Vahsholtz (#90)

Lowe's presents the SpongeBob SquarePants Movie 300

The Lowe's presents the SpongeBob SquarePants Movie 300 was held on October 15 at Lowe's Motor Speedway. Casey Mears won the pole.

Top ten results

20-Mike Bliss
17-Matt Kenseth
48-Jimmie Johnson
60-Greg Biffle
5-Kyle Busch
8-Martin Truex Jr.
1-Casey Mears
66-Jamie McMurray
23-Kenny Wallace
21-Clint Bowyer

This was Bliss' first NASCAR Busch Series win.
Failed to qualify: Paul Menard (#11), Eric McClure (#04), Kertus Davis (#0), Kenny Hendrick (#51), Brad Teague (#52), Gus Wasson (#10), Jimmy Kitchens (#77), Scott Lynch (#6), Jimmy Henderson (#63), Tina Gordon (#39), Travis Geisler (#36), Brian Sockwell (#41), Robby Benton (#03), Larry Hollenbeck (#62)

Sam's Town 250 benefitting St. Jude

The Sam's Town 250 benefitting St. Jude was held on October 23 at Memphis Motorsports Park. Martin Truex Jr. won the pole.

Top ten results

8-Martin Truex Jr.
60-Greg Biffle
2-Ron Hornaday Jr.
21-Clint Bowyer
20-Mike Bliss
22-Jason Keller
32-David Stremme
27-Johnny Sauter
46-Ashton Lewis
1-Reed Sorenson

Failed to qualify: Joe Buford (#53), Kertus Davis (#0), Jason White (#71), Shane Hall (#28), Bruce Bechtel (#52), Kenny Hendrick (#51), Jimmy Kitchens (#77), Tina Gordon (#39), Todd Shafer (#40), Stan Boyd (#70), David Ragan (#95)

Aaron's 312 (Atlanta)

The Aaron's 312 was held on October 30 at Atlanta Motor Speedway. Mike Bliss won the pole.

Top ten results

17-Matt Kenseth
5-Kyle Busch
38-Kasey Kahne
55-Robby Gordon
60-Greg Biffle
9-Mark Martin
23-Kenny Wallace
32-David Stremme
8-Martin Truex Jr.
18-J. J. Yeley

Failed to qualify: John Hayden (#16), Blake Mallory (#51), Kevin Conway (#67), Todd Bodine (#31), Tina Gordon (#39), Mark Gibson (#34), Jimmy Kitchens (#77)

Bashas' Supermarkets 200

The Bashas' Supermarkets 200 was held on November 6 at Phoenix International Raceway. Kyle Busch won the pole.

Top ten results

41-Jamie McMurray
5-Kyle Busch
8-Martin Truex Jr.
55-Robby Gordon
60-Greg Biffle
9-Mark Martin
66-Rusty Wallace
17-Matt Kenseth
46-Ashton Lewis
00-Tony Raines

Failed to qualify: Eric Jones (#73), Charlie Bradberry (#35), Kevin Lepage (#71), Brad Teague (#52), John Borneman III (#83), Kertus Davis (#0), Joey Miller (#98), Mike Harmon (#54), Clint Vahsholtz (#90), Tina Gordon (#39), Kenny Hendrick (#51)

BI-LO 200

The final BI-LO 200 was held on November 13 at Darlington Raceway. Martin Truex Jr. won the pole.

Top ten results

66-Jamie McMurray
46-Ashton Lewis
20-Mike Bliss
8-Martin Truex Jr.
17-Matt Kenseth
1-Casey Mears
23-Kenny Wallace
18-Denny Hamlin
41-Reed Sorenson
99-Michael Waltrip

Failed to qualify: Aaron Fike (#43), Kevin Lepage (#71), Dion Ciccarelli (#84), Randy Briggs (#85), Norm Benning (#84), Mike Harmon (#54), Jimmy Spencer (#98), Carl Long (#83)

Truex won the NASCAR Busch Series championship at this race, marking the first time in the track's 55-year history a NASCAR champion had been crowned at the track.
This is Denny Hamlin’s first career Busch Series start.

Ford 300

The Ford 300 was held on November 20 at Homestead-Miami Speedway. Casey Mears won the pole.

Top ten results

29-Kevin Harvick
66-Jamie McMurray
5-Kyle Busch
41-Reed Sorenson
31-Todd Bodine
17-Matt Kenseth
2-Ron Hornaday Jr.
87-Joe Nemechek
8-Martin Truex Jr.
60-Greg Biffle

Failed to qualify: Kertus Davis (#0), Mark Green (#26), Eric McClure (#04), Kevin Lepage (#71), Gus Wasson (#10), Tina Gordon (#39), Dion Ciccarelli (#84), Jimmy Kitchens (#77), Jeff Fuller (#88), Blake Mallory (#28)

Results and standings

Races

Drivers' Championship

(key) Bold – Pole position awarded by time. Italics – Pole position set by 2004 Owner's points. * – Led Laps.

Rookie of the Year

19-year-old Kyle Busch easily won Rookie of the Year honors in 2004, as he won five races and finished second in points. Runner-up Paul Menard started the year with Andy Petree Racing, then finished the season at Dale Earnhardt, Inc. Clint Bowyer and J. J. Yeley ran partial schedules and had seven and four top-tens, respectively, while Travis Geisler and Stan Boyd ran with teams on limited budgets. Last-place-finisher Billy Parker, younger brother of Hank Parker Jr., started the season with the new Rusty Wallace, Inc. team, but was released during the season.

See also
 2004 NASCAR Nextel Cup Series
 2004 NASCAR Craftsman Truck Series

External links
Busch Series Standings and Statistics for 2004

NASCAR Xfinity Series seasons